The Face is an Australian reality television modelling competition series aired on Fox8 of Foxtel and produced by Shine Australia. Naomi Campbell was the show's executive producer and one of the three supermodel coaches of the series, as with the American and British versions. It was reported that the channel and production team acquired the right to create an adaptation for Australian TV on 31 August 2013. Filming for the series took place from 1 November to 4 December 2013. The series premiered on 18 March 2014 and concluded on 6 May 2014.

The show premiered to 40,000 national viewers, which was the 18th most watched show on subscription television that night, but only fourth most watched program on FOX8. The remaining episodes of the series rated under 50,000 national viewers, with the finale attracting only 16,000 viewers (plus 25,000 viewers on FOX8 +2).

Hosts and Mentors

Seasons

'Mentor's color symbols
 Team Cheyenne (Season 1)
 Team Naomi (Season 1)
 Team Nicole (Season 1)

See also
 The Face (U.S.) Make Me a Supermodel Australia's Next Top Model''

References

External links 
Official Site

Fox8 original programming
2014 Australian television series debuts
2014 Australian television series endings
2010s Australian reality television series
English-language television shows
Australia
Australian television series based on American television series